Nzaeli Kyomo (born 2 June 1957) is a Tanzanian former sprinter who competed in the 1980 Moscow and 1984 Los Angeles Olympics.  She is the founder of Kyomo.org which provide basic education, clothing and food for the children of Tanzania.  She is also a dancer and member of Art of the Olympians.

References

External links

1957 births
Living people
Tanzanian female sprinters
Olympic athletes of Tanzania
Athletes (track and field) at the 1980 Summer Olympics
Athletes (track and field) at the 1984 Summer Olympics
Commonwealth Games competitors for Tanzania
Athletes (track and field) at the 1974 British Commonwealth Games
Athletes (track and field) at the 1978 Commonwealth Games
Athletes (track and field) at the 1982 Commonwealth Games
Olympic female sprinters